Muḥammad ibn ʾIbrāhīm ibn ʿAbd al-Laṭīf ibn ʿAbd al-Raḥmān ibn Ḥasan ibn Muḥammad ibn Abd al-Wahhāb Al Shaykh Al-Tamīmī (1890–1969), was a Saudi Arabian religious scholar who was the Grand Mufti of Saudi Arabia from 1953 to his death in 1969. He is recognised as being amongst the forefront of Salafi theologians in history.

Background
Muhammad ibn Ibrahim Al ash-Sheikh was born in Riyadh in 1890 to the noted family of Saudi religious scholars, the Al ash-Sheikh, descendants of Muhammad ibn Abd al-Wahhab. His father was Sheikh Ibrahim ibn Abdul Latif Al As Sheikh, and his mother was Jawharah bint Abdul Aziz Al Hilali. He had a very religious upbringing. He memorized Quran in an early age. He lost his sight around the year 1328 AH, and he knew to read and write before losing sight.

Rebellion of King Faisal 
As Grand Mufti of Saudi Arabia he gave a fatwa legitimising the armed rebellion of future King Faisal against his brother King Saud.

Role as Grand Mufti
As Grand Mufti of Saudi Arabia from 1953 to 1969,  he dominated Saudi religious policy in the 1950s and 1960s. He died in 1969.

Other roles
He served as president of the Constituent Council of the Muslim World League. He was one of the closest advisors of King Faisal having significant effects on the latter's role in the Arab world.

Family
Muhammad was the father of Ibrahim ibn Muhammad Al ash-Sheikh, Saudi minister of justice from 1975 to 1990 and Abdullah ibn Muhammad Al ash-Sheikh, Saudi minister of justice from 1993 to 2009.

He was the first cousin of King Faisal whose mother, Tarfa bin Abdullah, was from the Al Sheikh family.

References

External links

20th-century Muslim scholars of Islam
1890 births
1969 deaths
Salafi Islamists
Grand Muftis of Saudi Arabia
Saudi Arabian Wahhabists